The 1977 Federation Cup was the 15th edition of the most important competition between national teams in women's tennis.  The tournament was held at Devonshire Park Lawn Tennis Club in Eastbourne, United Kingdom, from 13–18 June. The United States defended their title, defeating Australia in their seventh final.

Participating teams

Draw
All ties were played at Devonshire Park in Eastbourne, United Kingdom, on grass courts.

1st and 2nd Round losing teams play in Consolation rounds

First round

United States vs. Austria

Switzerland vs. Norway

Greece vs. Portugal

 Denise Panagopoulou, who defeated Graça Cardoso in the first rubber, holds the Fed Cup record for the youngest player at 12 years and 360 days (although players must now be aged 14 years or older).

France vs. Luxembourg

Belgium vs. New Zealand

South Africa vs. Japan

Uruguay vs. Netherlands

Great Britain vs. Denmark

Mexico vs. South Korea

Finland vs. Sweden

Argentina vs. Chile

West Germany vs. Spain

Ireland vs. Canada

Chinese Taipei vs. Brazil

Indonesia vs. Australia

Second round

United States vs. Switzerland

Greece vs. France

New Zealand vs. South Africa

Israel vs. Netherlands

Great Britain vs. South Korea

Sweden vs. Argentina

West Germany vs. Canada

Brazil vs. Australia

Quarterfinals

United States vs. France

South Africa vs. Netherlands

Great Britain vs. Sweden

West Germany vs. Australia

Semifinals

United States vs. South Africa

Great Britain vs. Australia

Final

United States vs. Australia

Consolation rounds

Draw

First round

Italy vs. Mexico

Chinese Taipei vs. Uruguay

Indonesia vs. Norway

Portugal vs. Japan

Ireland vs. South Korea

Brazil vs. Canada

New Zealand vs. Switzerland

Second round

Belgium vs. Spain

Chile vs. Argentina

Denmark vs. Italy

Uruguay vs. Norway

Japan vs. South Korea

Canada vs. Switzerland

Greece vs. Finland

Luxembourg vs. Israel

Quarterfinals

Belgium vs. Argentina

Denmark vs. Uruguay

Japan vs. Canada

Finland vs. Israel

Semifinals

Belgium vs. Denmark

Japan vs. Israel

Final

Denmark vs. Japan

References

Billie Jean King Cups by year
Federation
Tennis tournaments in England
Federation Cup, 1977
Federation Cup
Federation Cup